Vincent Peter Jones (born 5 January 1965) is a British actor, presenter, and former professional footballer.

Jones played professionally as a defensive midfielder from 1984 to 1999, notably for Wimbledon, Leeds United, Sheffield United, Chelsea, and Queens Park Rangers. He also played for and captained the Welsh national team, having qualified through a Welsh grandparent. Best remembered for his time at Wimbledon as a pivotal member of the famous "Crazy Gang", he won the 1988 FA Cup final with the London side, a club for which he played over 200 games during two spells between 1986 and 1998. He played 184 games in the Premier League, in which he scored 13 goals. Throughout his career, Jones gained a reputation for a highly aggressive and physically uncompromising style of play, earning him a "hard man" image on and off the field.

Since retiring from football in 1998, Jones capitalised on his tough image and is now well known as an actor; he is often typecast as violent criminals and thugs. His film career began with Lock, Stock and Two Smoking Barrels (1998) and continued with roles in films such as Snatch (2000), Gone in 60 Seconds (2000), Mean Machine (2001), and Juggernaut in X-Men: The Last Stand (2006). He has also appeared on television, namely as Sebastian Moran in Elementary and Brick in Arrow.

Early life

Vincent Peter Jones was born on 5 January 1965 in Watford, Hertfordshire, the son of Glenda (née Harris) and gamekeeper Peter Jones. He attended schools in nearby Bedmond and Abbots Langley, and captained his school's football team. He is of partial Welsh and Irish descent.

Football career

Club career

Wealdstone
Having begun playing as a teenager in local amateur football, a 19-year-old Jones was signed on semi-professional terms by Wealdstone of the Alliance Premier League in 1984. A young addition to the experienced Wealdstone team which was soon to become the first ever club to achieve the non-league "double" in the 1984–85 season, he was a non-playing squad member in the club's victory at Wembley Stadium in the 1985 FA Trophy final. He combined playing football with working as a hod carrier on construction sites.

Loan to IFK Holmsund
He played one season on loan with Swedish club IFK Holmsund in 1986, helping to lead the team to the Division 3 Mellersta Norrland title.

Wimbledon
In the autumn of 1986, a 21-year-old Jones became a full-time professional footballer when he was signed by Wimbledon of the First Division, who paid Wealdstone £10,000 for him. He scored in only his second appearance for Wimbledon on 29 November 1986, in a 1–0 win over Manchester United. He was a member of the Wimbledon team which won the FA Cup in 1988, beating league champions Liverpool 1–0 in the final. Wimbledon cemented their status as a formidable First Division side during this time, with Jones making his name as an enthusiastic and uncompromisingly tough midfielder and a leading member of Wimbledon's famed Crazy Gang.

Leeds United
Jones was transferred from Wimbledon to Leeds United for a fee of £650,000 in June 1989, and played in all but one league games as Leeds finished as champions of the Second Division, winning promotion to the First Division in 1990. Jones proved he could thrive, and under the stewardship of Howard Wilkinson he received only three yellow cards during the entire season.

Sheffield United
Jones left Leeds United early in the 1990–91 season after losing his regular first-team place to youngsters David Batty and Gary Speed. His former Wimbledon manager Dave Bassett signed him for Sheffield United in September 1990 for a transfer fee of £700,000. He played a total of 35 matches for The Blades in the First Division, scoring two goals.

Chelsea
Jones was then sold to Chelsea a year later on 30 August 1991, for a fee of £575,000. Jones made his Chelsea debut one day after his signing in the 4–1 win against Luton. On 18 September 1991, Jones scored his first goal for the club in the 2–0 win against Aston Villa. He went on to make 52 total appearances for Chelsea, scoring 7 goals and receiving only 3 yellow cards.

Return to Wimbledon
After just one season at Stamford Bridge, he was back with Wimbledon in the early stages of the 1992–93 season, when the Premier League had just been formed. He helped Wimbledon equal their best ever league finish in 1993–94, when they finished sixth in the Premier League. Three seasons later, he contributed to another strong season for the club, who reached the semi-finals of both the FA Cup and the League Cup, and finished eighth in the Premier League. That season he scored the winning goal as Wimbledon won 1–0 against Arsenal at Highbury.

Queens Park Rangers
His second exit from Wimbledon came when he became player/coach of QPR in early 1998, scoring on his debut against Huddersfield Town. He announced his retirement from football in late 1998 at the age of 34.

International career
In December 1994 Jones was named in the Welsh national squad, qualifying under FIFA rules via his Ruthin-born maternal grandfather. He had previously sought to play for the Republic of Ireland due to eligibility through a grandparent. He made his international debut under Mike Smith for Wales on 14 December 1994, three weeks before his 30th birthday, in a 3–0 home defeat to Bulgaria in the Euro 96 qualifiers. When Smith was replaced as Wales manager by Jones’s former Wimbledon manager Bobby Gould a few months later, he remained a regular member of the Welsh national squad. The last of his nine caps came on 29 March 1997 in a 2–1 defeat to Belgium in a World Cup qualifier, also at Cardiff Arms Park.

Jones' international call-up was however greeted with consternation by some and was even ridiculed by Jimmy Greaves, who said, "Well, stone me! We've had cocaine, bribery and Arsenal scoring two goals at home. But just when you thought there were truly no surprises left in football, Vinnie Jones turns out to be an international player!".

Playing style
Jones was known for his "hard man" image on the pitch. He was sent off 12 times in his career, as well as holding the record for the quickest ever booking in a football match, being booked after just three seconds for a foul on the opposition player Dane Whitehouse in an FA Cup tie between Chelsea and Sheffield United in 1992. In his autobiography, he recalls: "I must have been too high, too wild, too strong or too early, because, after three seconds, I could hardly have been too bloody late!"
In an incident in October 1987, Jones was famously photographed covertly grabbing Paul Gascoigne by his testicles during a league game for Wimbledon against Newcastle United.

Controversies
He also was the presenter of the infamous Soccer's Hard Men video released in 1992, which featured archived footage of him and many other "hard men" of the game, and included advice for budding "hard men". After the release of the video, Jones was fined £20,000 and given a six-month ban (suspended for three years) for "bringing the game into disrepute". Wimbledon chairman Sam Hammam branded Jones a "mosquito brain". After this incident, Jones failed to stay out of trouble. After exceeding 40 disciplinary points that season, he was once again summoned to Lancaster Gate, the headquarters of The Football Association, but failed to appear. The FA banned Jones indefinitely. Jones explained that he had "mixed up" the date of the hearing, for which he received a four-match ban and was told by Football Association officials to "grow up". Jones commented later: "The FA have given me a pat on the back. I've taken violence off the terracing and onto the pitch" – an obvious reference to the football hooliganism problem which had blighted the English game during the 1970s and 1980s.

Other football activities
Jones made an appearance for Carlisle United, coming on as a second-half substitute in 2001 in a friendly against Irish team Shelbourne, teaming up with friend Roddy Collins who was manager at the time. In June 2010, he released a press statement stating that he was donating his 1988 FA Cup winners medal to the fans of AFC Wimbledon, wishing the club the best for the future. The medal is displayed at the club's stadium. He briefly served as club president of non-league Soham Town Rangers.

In 2020, Jones appeared on the ITV show Harry's Heroes, It featured former football manager Harry Redknapp attempting get a squad of former England international footballers back fit and healthy for one last game, vs a Germany Legends team. Despite playing for Wales during his professional career, Jones briefly took part in Season Two and played for the England legends in one of their warm up games against San Marino veterans.

Acting career

In 1998, Jones made his film debut in Guy Ritchie's crime comedy Lock, Stock and Two Smoking Barrels, in which he played a mob enforcer named Big Chris. He has since been typecast in similar roles as criminals or villains, including the dapper gun-for-hire "Bullet-Tooth Tony" in Ritchie's 2000 follow up Snatch. Jones became known to American audiences in the 2000 film remake of Gone in 60 Seconds, in which he played Sphinx. Although this was a major role with significant screen time, he only had one line of dialogue because his character was a silent, tough brawler. He teamed up with director Dominic Sena again the following year for the thriller Swordfish, in which he played one of John Travolta's henchmen.

Jones played Danny Meehan in Mean Machine, a 2001 British remake of the Burt Reynolds film The Longest Yard. He played a former captain of the England national football team, who is sent to prison and subsequently takes control of a team of inmates who play against the prison guards' team. In the 2004 Japanese film Survive Style 5+, he played a hitman from Britain. He played another football role as Mad Maynard, the leader of a Manchester United football hooligan firm, in the 2004 film EuroTrip. His next role was in the 2006 film, X-Men: The Last Stand, as the comic book villain Juggernaut. He said that he would like to play Juggernaut in a spin-off. One of his lines in the film ("I'm the Juggernaut, bitch!") was based on a pre-existing Internet parody. The same year, he was featured in another football film, She's the Man, as the coach of the Illyria team. In 2007, he played McStarley in The Condemned, a film about death row inmates forced to fight to the death on a remote island.

Jones was a housemate on the reality television show Celebrity Big Brother 7 in 2010, and celebrated his 45th birthday while he participated. He received loud cheers as he entered the house and was the favourite to win going into the house, but he did not maintain popularity with the public; the crowd chanted "get Vinnie out" on the final night and booed him as he left the house after he finished in third place. Speaking of his experience on the show, he said: "It was like One Flew Over the Cuckoo's Nest in there – and I was Jack Nicholson."

Jones played a professional killer in the Kazakhstani film Liquidator in 2011. His character is an elite assassin invited to eliminate the main character. Producers of the film dealt with the Kazakh-to-English language barrier by writing Jones' character as a mute who does not speak. In the same year, he played Zed in the movie Blood Out. He played a role in the Hungarian film The Magic Boys in 2012. That same year, he voiced Freddie the Dog in Madagascar 3: Europe's Most Wanted. He co-starred alongside Sylvester Stallone and Arnold Schwarzenegger in the action-thriller Escape Plan, released in 2013, and was featured with Danny Trejo in the 2014 horror-thriller Reaper.

In 2021, Jones competed in the third season of the Australian version of The Masked Singer as "Volcano". He was the first contestant eliminated.

Personal life
Having met Tanya Terry when they were both 12 years old and next-door neighbours in Watford, Jones later married her in 1994. Tanya had a daughter by her first husband, footballer Steve Terry. Jones and Tanya had a son, Aaron Ellison-Jones, who in 2008 graduated from the Army Foundation College in Harrogate, Yorkshire, and then was going on to join the Blues and Royals regiment of the British Army. In November 2013, Jones received treatment after finding signs of skin cancer below his eye. At some point, his wife was also diagnosed with skin cancer, which then spread to her brain by 2018. Jones was at her bedside during her death of cancer on 6 July 2019. He discussed her death during an appearance on Piers Morgan's Life Stories in September 2020, and said that he does not plan to remarry.

In 1998, Jones penned an autobiography called Vinnie: The Autobiography, which was later revised and reprinted to include information on his first film appearance. During his football career, he resided mainly in Dronfield, Derbyshire. He splits his time between Los Angeles and Petworth, West Sussex. He is a supporter of the Conservative Party and once described himself as "very proud of being British, very pro the monarchy, and very conservative".

Criminal charges
Jones was convicted in June 1998 of assault occasioning actual bodily harm and criminal damage against a neighbour in November 1997.

Jones was convicted in December 2003 of assault and threatening behaviour on an aircraft for an air rage incident, during which he slapped a passenger in the face and threatened to murder the cabin crew while drunk on an aircraft. He was fined £1,100 and ordered to perform 80 hours of community service. As a result of the conviction, Hertfordshire police revoked Jones' firearms licence and seized the weapons listed on the licence.

Career statistics

Club

International

Honours
Wealdstone
Alliance Premier League: 1984–85

IFK Holmsund

 Division 3 Mellersta Norrland: 1986

Wimbledon
FA Cup: 1987–88

Leeds United
Football League Second Division: 1989–90

Filmography

Film

Television

Music videos
Westlife - “Bop Bop Baby” (2002)
 As Duke Vincent, the vilest man in the kingdom for money. The band members serve as Musketeers who are imprisoned in a dungeon by the Duke.
Steve Aoki & LOOPERS - "Pika Pika" (2018)
Originally filmed for Steve Aoki & Knife Party - "Piledriver", but the original video was unreleased and the footage was re-edited and reused

Discography

Studio albums
 2002: Respect

Singles
 "Wooly Bully" (1993)

References

External links

 
 
 
 

1965 births
Living people
20th-century English male actors
21st-century English male actors
Chelsea F.C. players
Conservative Party (UK) people
National League (English football) players
English male film actors
English footballers
English people convicted of assault
English people of Welsh descent
English male television actors
Hollywood United players
Leeds United F.C. players
People convicted of assault occasioning actual bodily harm
Sportspeople from Watford 
Premier League players
Queens Park Rangers F.C. players
Sheffield United F.C. players
English Football League players
Wales international footballers
Welsh people of English descent
Wealdstone F.C. players
Wimbledon F.C. players
Musicians from Hertfordshire
English male singers
Male actors from Hertfordshire
IFK Holmsund players
Association football midfielders
English expatriate sportspeople in the United States
Expatriate soccer players in the United States
English expatriate footballers
English expatriate sportspeople in Sweden
Expatriate footballers in Sweden
Welsh footballers
Outfield association footballers who played in goal
Telstar Records artists
Sportspeople convicted of crimes
FA Cup Final players